Engleman is the surname of the following people:
Ephraim Engleman (1911–2015), American rheumatologist 
Glennon Engleman (1927–1999), American murderer
Jennadean Engleman (1890–1940), birth name of Bird Millman, high-wire performer
Howard Engleman (1919–2011), American college basketball player
Michael Engleman (born 1958), American cyclist

English-language surnames